Augusto Jesús Porozo Caicedo (born 13 April 1974) is an Ecuadorian football (soccer) defender who played for Club Social y Deportivo Macará.

Club career
He played mostly for CS Emelec. He also played for the Peruvian soccer club Alianza Lima.

International career
Porozo played for the Ecuador national football team and was a participant at the 2002 FIFA World Cup.

International goals
Scores and results list Ecuador's goal tally first.

Honours

Club
 Club Sport Emelec
 Serie A de Ecuador: 1993, 1994, 2001, 2002

References

External links
 rsssf

1974 births
Living people
Sportspeople from Guayaquil
Association football defenders
Ecuadorian footballers
Ecuador international footballers
2001 Copa América players
2002 FIFA World Cup players
2002 CONCACAF Gold Cup players
C.S. Emelec footballers
Barcelona S.C. footballers
S.D. Aucas footballers
Club Alianza Lima footballers
C.D. El Nacional footballers
C.S.D. Macará footballers
Ecuadorian expatriate footballers
Expatriate footballers in Peru